The 1991 European Cup was the 27th edition of the European Cup, IIHF's premier European club ice hockey tournament. The season started on October 11, 1991, and finished on December 30, 1991.

The tournament was won by Djurgårdens IF, who beat Düsseldorfer EG in the final.

First group round

Group A
(Herning, Denmark)

Group A standings

Group B
(București, Romania)

Group B standings

Group C
(Milan, Italy)

Group C standings

 SC Bern,
 Dukla Jihlava,
 TPS,
 Düsseldorfer EG,
 Dynamo Moscow,  Djurgårdens IF   :  bye

Second group round

Group D
(Bern, Bern, Switzerland)

Group D standings

Group E
(Düsseldorf, North Rhine-Westphalia, Germany)

Group E standings

Group F
(Piešťany, Slovak Republic, Czechoslovakia)

Group F standings

Final stage
(Düsseldorf, North Rhine-Westphalia, Germany)

Third round

Group A

Group A standings

Group B

Group B standings

Third place match

Final

References
 Season 1991

1
IIHF European Cup